The African BMX Racing Championships (French : Championnat d'afrique de BMX) is the African top BMX Racing Championships that was created by the year of 2014 and Organized every single year since, and it is ruled and managed by the African Cycling Confederation.

Editions

Men's summary

Elites

juniors

Women's summary

Elites

juniors

References

External links
 Official Webpage
 UCI Website

African championships
BMX
BMX competitions
Recurring sporting events established in 2014